Rwngwra Narzary is an Indian politician. Narzary is a Member of Parliament, representing Assam in the Rajya Sabha the upper house of India's Parliament as a member of the United People's Party Liberal. He is working President of United People's Party Liberal since 2020.  He is also chairman of the Kajalgaon Municipal Board.

References

Rajya Sabha members from Assam
United People's Party Liberal politicians
1970 births
Living people